Codoi may refer to:

Elena Ceaușescu (1916–1989), nickname Codoi, wife of Romania's Communist leader Nicolae Ceaușescu
Codoi, Lhari County, township of Tibet
Chundui Township, or Codoi, in Tibet